The Vortech Meg-2XH Strap-On is an American helicopter that was designed and produced by Vortech of Fallston, Maryland. Now out of production, when it was available the aircraft was supplied as a kit and also in the form of plans for amateur construction. Vortech also supplied rotor blades for the design.

While listed as available early in 1998, by the end of that year the aircraft was no longer listed on the Vortech website.

Design and development
It features a single main rotor, a single fold-up seat and a rudder. The aircraft is supported by a partial frame when on the ground, but take-off and landing are both accomplished by foot and the aircraft is worn like a backpack, hence the name. The helicopter was designed to be powered by a single jet engine producing .

The aircraft fuselage frame is made from bolted-together aluminum tubing and has a  diameter two-bladed rotor.

The manufacturer estimated the construction time from the supplied bolt-together assembly kit as 30 hours.

Operational history
By 1998 the company reported that three kits had been sold, were completed and flying.

Specifications (Meg-2XH Strap-On)

See also
List of rotorcraft

References

Meg-2XH
1990s United States sport aircraft
1990s United States helicopters
Homebuilt aircraft
Single-turbine helicopters